WHFX (107.7 FM) is a radio station broadcasting a classic rock format. Licensed to Darien, Georgia, United States, the station serves the Brunswick area. The station is owned by iHeartMedia, Inc., through licensee iHM Licenses, LLC.

History
The station went on the air as WYNR on September 9, 1991. On October 8, 2002, the station changed its call sign to WBGA, and on April 4, 2005, to the current WHFX.

On May 15, 2014, Qantum Communications announced that it would sell its 29 stations, including WHFX, to Clear Channel Communications (now iHeartMedia), in a transaction connected to Clear Channel's sale of WALK AM-FM in Patchogue, New York to Connoisseur Media via Qantum. The transaction was consummated on September 9, 2014.

On October 29, 2018, it was announced that, as iHeartMedia would lose its grandfathered ownership limits in the Brunswick and Grand Forks markets as part of its bankruptcy restructuring, the company would place KSNR and WHFX into the newly formed Sun & Snow Station Trust, under the oversight of former Backyard Broadcasting CEO Barry Drake, as preparation for an eventual sale of the signals. However, iHeartMedia was able to take WHFX back from the trust on September 3, 2019, due to sister station WSOL-FM (serving the adjacent Jacksonville market) changing its city of license to Yulee, Florida.

References

External links

HFX
Radio stations established in 1991
1991 establishments in Georgia (U.S. state)
IHeartMedia radio stations
Classic rock radio stations in the United States